Heketara is the Māori name for at least two different species of plants native to New Zealand:

Olearia rani, a widespread small native forest tree.
Lepidium oleraceum, a threatened coastal plant.

Flora of New Zealand
Trees of New Zealand